The Message is a surreal comedy series which spoofs current practices in the television industry. It originally aired in 2006 on BBC Three. It consistes of six episodes, and was not renewed after the first season.

External links
 Comedy Guide
theMessage Official site.

BBC television comedy
2006 British television series debuts
2006 British television series endings